Sir Antony James Beevor,  (born 14 December 1946) is a British military historian. He has published several popular historical works on the Second World War and the Spanish Civil War.

Early life
Born in Kensington, Beevor was educated at two independent schools; Abberley Hall School in Worcestershire, followed by Winchester College in Hampshire. He then went to the Royal Military Academy Sandhurst, where he studied under the military historian John Keegan before receiving a commission in the 11th Hussars on 28 July 1967. Beevor served in England and Germany and was promoted to lieutenant on 28 January 1969 before resigning his commission on 5 August 1970.

Career
Beevor has been a visiting professor at the School of History, Classics and Archaeology at Birkbeck, University of London, and at the University of Kent.

His best-known works, the best-selling Stalingrad (1998) and Berlin: The Downfall 1945 (2002), recount the World War II battles between the Soviet Union and Germany. They have been praised for their vivid, compelling style, their treatment of the ordinary lives of combatants and civilians, and the use of newly disclosed documents from Soviet archives.

His The Spanish Civil War (1982) was later re-written as The Battle for Spain (2006), keeping the structure and some content from the earlier work, but using the updated narrative style of his Stalingrad book and also adding characters and new archival research from German and Russian sources.

Beevor's book The Second World War (2012) is notable for its focus on the conditions and grief faced by women and civilians and for its coverage of the war in East Asia, which has been called "masterful". He has also appeared as an expert in television documentaries related to World War II.

Overall, his works have been translated into over 30 languages with over 6 million copies sold.

In August 2015, Russia's Yekaterinburg region considered banning Beevor's books, accusing him of Nazi sympathies, citing his lack of Russian sources when writing about Russia, and claiming he had promoted false stereotypes introduced by Nazi Germany during World War II. Beevor responded by calling the banning "a government trying to impose its own version of history", comparing it to other "attempts to dictate a truth", such as denial of the Holocaust and the Armenian genocide.

In January 2018, Beevor's book about the Battle of Stalingrad was banned in Ukraine. Beevor told Radio Free Europe/Radio Liberty: "I must say, this sounds absolutely astonishing. There's certainly nothing inherently anti-Ukrainian in the book at all."

Personal life
Beevor is descended from a long line of writers, being a son of Kinta Beevor (born Janet Carinthia Waterfield, 22 December 191129 August 1995), who was the daughter of Lina Waterfield, an author and foreign correspondent for The Observer and a descendant of Lucie, Lady Duff-Gordon (author of a travelogue on Egypt). Kinta Beevor wrote A Tuscan Childhood. Antony Beevor is married to biographer Artemis Cooper; they have two children, Nella and Adam. As of 2013, Beevor resides in a town house in Fulham.

Honours
Beevor was appointed a Knight Bachelor in the 2017 New Year Honours for "services in support of Armed Forces Professional Development".

He is a Chevalier de l'Ordre des Arts et des Lettres, a member of Order of the Cross of Terra Mariana and a commander of the Belgian Order of the Crown.

Beevor was elected an honorary Fellow of King's College London in July 2016. He was also awarded an Honorary D.Litt. from the University of Bath in 2010, and an honorary doctorate from the University of Kent, awarded in 2004.

His book Crete: The Battle and the Resistance won the Runciman Prize, administered by the Anglo-Hellenic League for stimulating interest in Greek history and culture.

Beevor has been recognised with the 2014 Pritzker Military Museum & Library's Literature Award for Lifetime Achievement in Military Writing. Tim O'Brien, the 2013 recipient, made the announcement on behalf of the selection committee. The award carried a purse of US$100,000.

In July 2016, he was awarded the Medlicott Medal for services to history by the UK-based Historical Association.

Beevor also sits on the Council of the Society of Authors.

Awards
Crete: The Battle and the Resistance
Runciman Prize
Stalingrad
Samuel Johnson Prize for Non-Fiction
Wolfson History Prize
Hawthornden Prize for Literature
Berlin: The Downfall 1945
Longman-History Today Trustees' Award
The Battle for Spain: The Spanish Civil War 1936–1939 (Spanish Edition)
La Vanguardia Prize for Non-Fiction

Published works

Fiction
 Violent Brink. London: John Murray, 1975. 
 For Reasons of State. London: Jonathan Cape, 1980. 
 The Faustian Pact. London: Jonathan Cape, 1983. 
 The Enchantment of Christina von Retzen. London: Weidenfeld & Nicolson, 1989.

Nonfiction
 The Spanish Civil War. London: Orbis, 1982. 
 Inside the British Army. London: Chatto and Windus, 1990. 

 Crete: The Battle and the Resistance. London: John Murray, 1991. 
 with  Artemis Cooper. Paris After the Liberation, 1944–1949. London: Penguin, 1994.
 Stalingrad. London: Viking Press, 1998. 
 Berlin: The Downfall 1945. London: Penguin, 2002.  (Published as The Fall of Berlin 1945 in the U.S.)
 The Mystery of Olga Chekhova. London: Penguin, 2004. 
 The Battle for Spain: The Spanish Civil War 1936–1939. London: Weidenfeld & Nicolson, 2006. 
 D-Day: The Battle for Normandy. London: Penguin, 2009. 
 The Second World War. London: Weidenfeld & Nicolson, 2012. 
 Ardennes 1944: Hitler's Last Gamble. Viking, 2015. 
 Arnhem: The Battle for the Bridges, 1944. Viking, 2018. 
 Russia: Revolution and Civil War, 1917—1921. London: Weidenfeld & Nicolson, 2022.

Edited volumes
 A Writer at War: Vasily Grossman with the Red Army 1941–1945 by Vasily Grossman.

Book contributions
 The British Army, Manpower and Society into the Twenty-First Century, ed by Hew Strachan 
 What Ifs? of American History: Eminent Historians Imagine What Might Have Been, by Robert Cowley (Editor), Antony Beevor and Caleb Carr. (2003)

References

External links

Antony Beevor Stalingrad Berlin - The Downfall 1945
Antony Beevor discusses his book on the Spanish Civil War

Interview on The Second World War at the Pritzker Military Museum & Library on 21 June 2012
Sir Antony Beevor on Desert Island Discs, BBC Radio 4, 19 February 2017

1946 births
People from Kensington
Military personnel from London
20th-century British Army personnel
11th Hussars officers
20th-century British novelists
21st-century British writers
20th-century British historians
21st-century British historians
Academics of Birkbeck, University of London
British military historians
British military writers
Fellows of the Royal Society of Literature
Historians of World War II
Knights Bachelor
Living people
People educated at Winchester College
Recipients of the Order of the Cross of Terra Mariana, 3rd Class
Historians of the Spanish Civil War
Fellows of King's College London